Joey Mathijs Pelupessy (born 15 May 1993) is a Dutch professional footballer who plays as a defensive midfielder for Groningen.

Career

Twente
Pelupessy formerly played for FC Twente between 2004 and 2014, having progressed through to the club's senior team after playing in the club's U19 and U21 teams. In the 2013–14 season, Pelupessy was selected for three match squads for the senior team, but he didn't make an appearance for the club before the transferred to fellow Eredivisie side Heracles Almelo.

Heracles Almelo
Pelupessy joined Heracles Almelo in July 2014 on a free transfer, where he was assigned the number 14 shirt. He scored his first goal for his new club on 4 October 2014, which was also his team's fourth goal in their Eredivisie game against NAC Breda. The match ultimately ended 6–1.

At the start of the 2017–18 season, his final season at the club, Pelupessy was made team captain. After 117 appearances and five goals for Heracles Almelo, Pelupessy left the club to sign for EFL Championship team Sheffield Wednesday.

Sheffield Wednesday
On 18 January 2018, Pelupessy signed for EFL Championship team Sheffield Wednesday, becoming new manager Jos Luhukay's first signing for the club. He was assigned the number 32 shirt. He scored his first goal for the Owls on 20 February 2018 against Millwall.
On 4 June 2020, he extended his stay at the club by a further year until 2021.

On 20 May 2021 it was announced that he would leave Sheffield Wednesday at the end of the season, following the expiry of his contract.

Giresunspor
In July 2021, he joined Turkish side Giresunspor.

Groningen
On 25 April 2022, Pelupessy agreed to return to the Netherlands and join Groningen on a three-year deal.

Personal life
Born in the Netherlands, Pelupessy is of Indonesian descent.

Career statistics

References

External links
 Voetbal International profile 

1993 births
People from Hellendoorn
Footballers from Overijssel
Dutch people of Indonesian descent
Living people
Association football midfielders
Dutch footballers
FC Twente players
Heracles Almelo players
Sheffield Wednesday F.C. players
Giresunspor footballers
FC Groningen players
Eredivisie players
Eerste Divisie players
English Football League players
Süper Lig players
Dutch expatriate footballers
Expatriate footballers in England
Dutch expatriate sportspeople in England
Expatriate footballers in Turkey
Dutch expatriate sportspeople in Turkey
Jong FC Twente players